AeroGear is an open-source red hat project that brings security and development expertise to cross-platform enterprise mobile development. It is a coding platform that simplifies mobile development and cross-platform infrastructure setup.

History 
AeroGear was founded in 2012 as a JBoss project, appealing to coders and programmers around the world. In November 2012, it released its first project, the AeroGear 1.0.0.M6 for the iOS which “lays down the foundation for data synchronization and security”. The AeroGear UnifiedPush Server 1.1.0 was released on Nov 5th, 2015. AeroGear Mobile Services 1.0.0 was released on Jul 4th, 2018.

Coding Principles and Objectives 

AeroGear is a project that provide support to mobile developers who are working with traditional Java EE backends through iOS and Android libraries as well as JavaScript.

AeroGear offers an open platform for coders who can be assigned projects based on preferences. It is based on an unified Application Program Interface (API) which offers a pipeline for languages such as Android, iOS, and Javascript.

In 2018, AeroGear moved focus to provide services on OpenShift, for example, push notifications and authentication.

References

External links 
 

Software using the Apache license
Cross-platform mobile software
Cross-platform free software